The National European Social Movement (NESB) was a Dutch neo-Nazi party, founded in 1953 as the political arm of the Stichting Oud Politieke Delinquenten ("Foundation for Political Delinquents"), and disbanded by a ruling of the Dutch Supreme Court in 1955.

Since the Second World War, three parties have been disbanded by court order in the Netherlands. The other two parties are the Nederlandse Volks-Unie (NVU, Dutch People's Union) and Centre Party '86.

The NESB was founded by Paul van Tienen, a former Waffen-SS commandant in the Wiking Division, and Jan Wolthuis, a former NSB member.

References

Banned far-right parties
Defunct political parties in the Netherlands
Neo-Nazi political parties in Europe
Neo-Nazism in the Netherlands
1953 establishments in the Netherlands
Political parties disestablished in 1955